Zaļesje is a village in Ludza Municipality in the historical region of Latgale in Latvia. Zaļesje is the centre of Zaļesje Parish.

Ludza Municipality
Towns and villages in Latvia
Latgale